Aerial Boundaries is the second album by guitarist Michael Hedges released on the Windham Hill label in 1984. It was nominated for a Grammy Award as Best Engineered Recording.

Reception

Music critic Daniel Gioffre, writing for Allmusic, wrote of the album "There are moments on Aerial Boundaries where it seems literally impossible that so much music is coming from one man and his guitar... The songs on Aerial Boundaries are all beautiful and haunting in their own right; and it is this emphasis on composition over technique that makes this such an important recording... Aerial Boundaries is simply one of the finest acoustic guitar albums ever made, and deserves a place in the library of all serious music fans."

Track listing 
All compositions by Michael Hedges except "After the Gold Rush" by Neil Young.

 Tracks 1-4 & 6 recorded in the Living Room at the Windham Hill Inn, West Townshend, VT.
 Track 5 recorded at Sheffield Studio, Baltimore, MD.
 Track 7 realized at the Peabody Electronic Music Studio, Baltimore, MD.
 Track 8 recorded at Mobius Music, San Francisco, CA.
 Track 9 recorded at Different Fur Studio, San Francisco, CA.

Personnel 
 Michael Hedges – acoustic guitar
 Michael Manring – fretless bass
 Mindy Rosenfeld – flute

Production notes 
 Produced by Will Ackerman, Michael Hedges, Steven Miller
 Engineered by Steven Miller, Oliver Di Cicco, Bill Mueller, Michael Hedges

References 

1984 albums
Michael Hedges albums
Windham Hill Records albums
Albums produced by William Ackerman